Bomb attacks of Sindhudesh Liberation Army on Pakistan infrastructure like gas pipelines, railway-tracks, branches of national Banks., polls of high transmission lines  in Sindh have occurred since 2003. Sindhudesh Liberation Army an outfit of Sindhi nationalists claims responsibilities of these attacks.

Overview

Reasons behind attacks

Participating groups

All the separatist groups of Sindhi nationalists like JSMM, JSQM and others believes in political struggles. only one separatist outfit of Sindhi nationalists, Sindhudesh liberation Army believes in armed struggle for inception of Sindhudesh. SLA is only an organisation in Sindh that claims these attacks.

History

2016
 A vehicle of Chinese engineer targeted with remote control bomb at Gulshan-e-Hadeed Karachi. Chinese national and his driver were seriously injured.

2013
 November 5: A bomb planted near a railway track near Hussainabad in Hyderabad destroyed a portion of up-track. A second bomb went off in Khairpur District after the departure of the Shalimar Express to Karachi via the Gambat railway station.
July 12: Two powerful blasts rocked Hyderabad, one at the boundary wall of the office of Senior Superintendent of Police (SSP) Hyderabad and the other at a railway track in Hussainabad. Both the explosions were heard far and wide.

2012

 26 May 2012 – On the National Highway a group of unknown gunmen attacked and killed 7 people and at least 25 more were injured in a passenger bus. SLA claimed the attack.

2011

 November 27: Six bomb blasts damage railway tracks in Sindh.
 April 29: Blast forces train off the tracks in Sukkur.
 February 17: Twin blasts damage railway tracks in Karachi.
 February 15: Twin blasts damage railway tracks near Matiari.
 February 12:  Blast at rail track near Kotri station 
 February 11: Ten low-intensity explosions at railway tracks across Sindh.

2009–10
 2010
 6 November – Two (JSMM) activists were arrested after being suspected masterminds of the bomb incidents in begin November.
 November 4: A low-intensity bomb exploded at railway tracks near Nawabshah, just minutes after a cargo train carrying oil had passed. Another bomb was defused by the bomb disposal squad.
 November 2: 4 bombs go off, destroying railway tracks in Hyderabad.
 November 1: Two bomb blast at Railway Track between Kotri & Hyderabad.
 July 15: 3 feet of railway tracks destroyed in blast.
 July 14: Sindhi separatists try to blow up Hyderabad railway track, Bomb Disposal Squad defused four bombs found by residents on the track of the Odero Lal Railway Station in Hyderabad.
 2009

2002–06
From 2002 to 2006 there have been 120 bomb blasts in Sindh alone. CID solved 52 cases and 68 are still a mystery. The edition of 2006 Red Book, a confidential document, was printed. The total number of names in the book is 42, including JSMM chairman Shafi Muhammad Burfat alias Commando alias Ghulam Hussain Chandio. name of JSMM was included after several bomb blasts in the interior of Sindh, targeting railway tracks and sensitive government installations.
 2005
Two electricity pylons of 500kv high transmission line were damaged near the Sann railway station.

 2004
On 16 August  Two bombs exploded on the line minutes after it had passed near Nawabshah, 250 km (150 miles) north-east of Karachi. The first explosion damaged track, while the second a few minutes later wounded two policemen and a journalist who were at the scene.

 2003
Two separate acts of sabotage, portions of railway tracks were destroyed when bombs exploded on up and down tracks in Kotri and Nawabshah.

References

Terrorism in Pakistan
Terrorism-related lists